The National Council of Churches of Kenya (NCCK), (in Swahili, Baraza kuu la makanisa nchini Kenya) is a fellowship of Protestant churches and Christian organisations registered in Kenya. It is currently Chaired by the Africa Brotherhood Church (ABC) Archbishop Dr. Timothy N. Ndambuki. Its motto is "For Wananchi" which means "for citizens" (Wananchi meaning citizens in Swahili): This motto has been exemplified in NCCK's long involvement in public service, advocacy, and social responsibility in Kenya. It is a member of the Fellowship of Christian Councils and Churches in the Great Lakes and Horn of Africa.

The NCCK was nominated for the 2023 Nobel Peace Prize

Identity, Vision and Mission of NCCK 
Identity of the Council

A family of Christian communions and organizations in fellowship and witness.

Vision of the Council

One Church; United in Faith and Mission Witnessing to Jesus Christ and Transforming Lives

Mission of the Council

Holistic transformation of lives for a just, resilient and sustainable society.

Values of the Council
Integrity
Stewardship
Professionalism
Partnership
Servanthood

Governance of the Council

As defined by the NCCK Constitution, the supreme body of NCCK is the General Assembly (GA), which meets once every three years, which has an Executive Committee which meets biannually. This Committee has two sub-committees, namely, the Programme Committee, and the Finance and Administration committee. These committees meet regularly throughout the year, and work closely with the management team. The day-to-day operation of the Council is the responsibility of management team under the leadership of the General Secretary who is also the chief executive officer of the Council.

Management Team

Facilities
The Council's headquarters are located at the Jumuia Place, Lenana Road, Nairobi. This facility also serves as the Nairobi region offices. NCCK maintains nine regional offices throughout Kenya as well as five conference or retreat centers namely:
 Jumuia Guest House, Kisumu
 Jumuia Conference and Country Home, Limuru
 Jumuia Conference and Beach Resort, Kanamai

History of NCCK

Established in 1913, it has been a key player in mobilizing Kenyans in various political, economic, and social issues.
As such, NCCK's story is intricately intertwined with Kenya's national historical narrative.

 1844- Dr. Johann Ludwig Krapf, a German and the first missionary arrives in what would later become Kenya and starts work on the Coast. He is soon followed by other missionaries including Johannes Rebmann who establish several mission stations around the country.
 1908- By now several issues face the missionaries who have greatly increased in number, including the need for commonality in the names referencing God in the different local languages and dialects. Two mission conferences are held that year in Kijabe and Maseno.
 1909- Another conference is held in Kijabe, which paves the way for the formation of NCCK. A key resolution is made: "This Conference regards the development, organisation and establishment of a united self-governing, self-supporting and self-extending Native Church as the ideal in our Missionary Work." 
 1913- The first United Missionary Conference is held in June, in Thogoto, Kikuyu, Kenya, which nine missionary groups attend. A constitution proposing the formation of the Federation of Missions is discussed, and four missionary groups sign it. NCCK is born.
 1918- At the second United Missionary Conference, the name of the organization is changed to Alliance of Protestant Missions.
 1924- The membership is expanded beyond the original four members and the goals of the organization change. A new body called the Kenya Missionary Council is formed.
1943- As the country inches towards independence, there is need to broaden the membership to accommodate non-missionary Christian bodies. The objectives change once again, and the organization is then called Christian Council of Kenya (CCK).
 1966- Independence is won. To reflect the new state of affairs, the organization re-brands into National Christian Council of Kenya.
 1984- The name of the organisation is changed to National Council of Churches of Kenya to reflect the fact that membership to the organisation is by churches and not individual Christians.

Membership
NCCK has 37 member churches and organizations, who seek to facilitate the attainment of a united, just, peaceful and sustainable society. That is; 27 member churches, eleven associate members and six fraternal associate members. These are:

Full Members
Africa Brotherhood Church
African Christian Churches and Schools
African Church of the Holy Spirit
Africa Independent Pentecostal Church of Africa
African Interior Church
African Israel Nineveh Church
Anglican Church of Kenya
Church of Africa Sinai Mission
Coptic Orthodox Church
Episcopal Church of Africa
Evangelical Lutheran Church of Kenya
Friends Church in Kenya
Free Pentecostal Fellowship of Kenya
Full Gospel Churches of Kenya
Kenya Assemblies of God
Kenya Evangelical Lutheran Church
Kenya Mennonite Church
Lyahuka Church of East Africa
Maranatha Faith Assemblies
Methodist Church in Kenya
National Independent Church of Africa
Overcoming Faith Centre Church of Kenya
Pentecostal Evangelistic Fellowship of Africa
Presbyterian Church of East Africa
Reformed Church of East Africa
Salvation Army
Scriptural Holiness Mission
Zion Harvest Mission
Church of God
Planters international churches

Associate Members
Bible Society of Kenya 
Christian Churches Education Association
Christian Health Association of Kenya
Christian Hostels Fellowship
Kenya United Independent Churches
Mt Zion Church Kayole
Kenya Ecumenical Church Loan Fund
Christian Students Leadership Centre (Ufungamano House)
Kenya Students Christian Fellowship 
St Paul's University 
Public Law Institute
Young Women's Christian Association (World YWCA)
Young Men's Christian Association (YMCA)

Fraternal Members
African Evangelistic Enterprise 
Daystar University
Fellowship of Christian Unions (FOCUS)
Trans World Radio
Trinity Fellowship
World Vision International

References

External links
 National Council of Churches of Kenya
 NCCK Resorts

Churches in Kenya
National councils of churches
Christian organizations based in Africa